Sainik School, Gopalganj is a Sainik School  established by the Sainik Schools Society in 2003. Affiliated to CBSE Affiliation No.: 380003, School No.: 65126.

Location

Sainik School Gopalganj is located in Hathua, Gopalganj District in Bihar, India Pin:841436. A new building has been allocated by the State government near Kuchaikote within an area of 49 acres. The first phase has been completed.  When the building is completed, it is expected that the school will be shifted there. The construction of a new school building at the permanent location of Sainik School Gopalganj at Sipaya village in Kuchaikote block of Gopalganj district began in March 2013. With the release of phase 1, the construction of the boundary wall, administrative building, academic block, one hostel building (out of four), Cadet's mess, and gateway-super structure is completed. For the construction of phase 2, administrative approval of 38.48 crore rupees is under process at the Department of Education, Government of Bihar.

Introduction
The school is one among the 24 Sainik Schools under the aegis of the Sainik School Society, Ministry of Defence, Government of India. The school was established on 12 October 2003.

School emblem
The school insignia consists of the three services’ elements; the crossed swords of the Army, the golden eagle of the Air Force, and the anchor of the Navy. The main aim of the school is to train cadets to join the defence services. The school motto ‘Vidya Dadati Vinayam’ has been taken from the sixth verse of the preface of Sanskrit text ‘Hitopadesha’ and means ‘Education gives humility’.

History
Sainik School, Gopalganj was established on 12 October 2003. The school was built on the eight-acre Hathua Estate of the then Hathua Maharaj, near Mirganj in Gopalganj District. It is one of the two Sainik Schools started on the same day in the state of Bihar (20th in sequence).  The school started with 55 students in 2003. The first batch is known as The Pioneers. The second batch of 2004-2011 is known as The Valiants. The third batch (2005-2012) set a record with 100% results in class 12. The Alumni has its presence in all domains of UPSC, BPSC, IITs, NITs, IIMs, AIIMS, State Medical Colleges, NDA, INA, AFMC, AFA, CTW, CME, MHOW, AIT, JNU, BHU and State University.

House
All the cadets are assigned houses. There are four houses based on historical locations in Ancient India. These Houses are known as Takshashila (Red), Vikramashila (Green), Gandhara (Blue), Vaishali (Yellow). Each house is in two groups. The senior house from class 10 to 12 and the junior house class 6 to 9, all have a senior House Captain and a House Sergeant. They also have their own slogans. The Takshashilians call themselves ‘The Red Royals’, the Gandharians call themselves ‘The SkyLiners’, the Vaishalians call themselves ‘The Valiants’ and the Vikramshilians call themselves ‘The Victors’.

Management
The Sainik Schools are managed by a Society which is registered under the Societies Registration Act (XXI of 1860). A Board of Governors that functions under the Chairmanship of the Defence Minister, is the Chief Executive Body of the Sainik Schools Society. The Board of Governors meets at least once a year. The school has a Local Board of Administration for overseeing the functioning of the school and its finances.

The Chief Minister or the Education Minister of the state is among the members of the Board of Governors. An officer of the Ministry of Defence is nominated to supervise and coordinate the functioning of the school and functions as the Honorary Secretary of the Sainik Schools Society. The Honorary Secretary is assisted by officers and staff of the Ministry of Defence. This includes two inspecting officers of the rank of Colonel or equivalent. The Principal of the school is Col. Amit Dagar, Headmistress Lt. Col. Smita and the Administrative Officer is Sqn Ldr Piyush Kumar. Mr. SK Biswal, PGT(Eng) is the Senior Master of the school.

Admission
Admissions are given in Class VI, and Class IX. Admission for classes VI and IX is carried out on the basis of an entrance exam usually held in January.

Publish of Admission Form: During the month of October to December.

Last date of Submission of Admission form: First week of December.

Date of Entrance exam: First Sunday of January.

The school is for boys between the ages of 10 and 18 years. Boys are admitted to Class VI and IX while the majority of the admissions take place in the 6th class, since 1993, a small number of candidates are also admitted to Class IX.
An All India Sainik Schools Entrance Examination is held annually by NTA. There is a 67% quota for students of the host state, Bihar, 25% quota for defence candidates, and 15% and 7.5% respectively for SC and ST candidates. The rest of the boys come from the general category. About 3000 students from the state/country vie for admission for about 60 seats.

External links
 
 Sainik Schools Society

Sainik schools
Schools in Bihar
Gopalganj district, India
Educational institutions established in 2003
2003 establishments in Bihar